Groningen is the northeasternmost province of the Netherlands. It borders on Friesland to the west, Drenthe to the south, the German state of Lower Saxony to the east, and the Wadden Sea to the north.

Historically the area was at different times part of Frisia, the Frankish Empire, the Holy Roman Empire, and the Dutch Republic, the precursor state of the modern Netherlands. In the 14th century, the city of Groningen became a member of the Hanseatic League.

The provincial capital and the largest city in the province is the city of Groningen (231,299 inhabitants). Since 2016, René Paas has been the King's Commissioner in the province. A coalition of GroenLinks, the Labour Party, ChristianUnion, People's Party for Freedom and Democracy, Democrats 66, and Christian Democratic Appeal forms the executive branch. The province is divided into 10 municipalities.

The land is mainly used for agriculture. There are seaports in Delfzijl and Eemshaven. The Groningen gas field, one of the world's largest, was discovered in 1959. The province is home to the University of Groningen and Hanze University of Applied Sciences.

History 

Groningen was originally a part of Frisia. It became a part of the Frankish Empire around 785. Charlemagne assigned the Christianization of this new possession to Ludger.

In the 11th century, the city of Groningen was a village in Drenthe that belonged to the Bishopric of Utrecht, while most of the province was in the Prince-Bishopric of Münster.

During the Middle Ages, central control was remote, and the city of Groningen acted as a city-state, exerting a dominating influence on the surrounding Ommelanden. In the 14th century, Groningen became one of the towns within the Hanseatic League. In the years after, Groningen expanded its influence. At its peak almost all of the current province Friesland was under the influence and control of Groningen.

Shortly before 1498, Maximilian I, Holy Roman Emperor gave Groningen and Friesland to Albert III, Duke of Saxony, who could however not establish permanent control. In 1514/15 Groningen came to the Duchy of Guelders, and in 1536 as the Lordship of Groningen to the Habsburg Netherlands.

In 1594, Groningen was conquered from the Spanish by the Republic of the Seven United Provinces, precursor state of the Netherlands, to which it belonged henceforth.

During World War II, the Netherlands were occupied by Nazi Germany. In April 1945, the 2nd Canadian Division fought in the Battle of Groningen, which resulted in the liberation of the city and in the death of 130, the capture of 5,212, and the fleeing of 2,000 German soldiers. In May 1945, another 3,000 German soldiers were captured in the Battle of Delfzijl by the 5th Canadian Division, after which all of the northern provinces were liberated.

East Groningen was the scene of a particularly fierce class struggle in the 19th and 20th centuries. Perhaps not coincidentally, Groningen boasts the only municipality (Beerta) where the Communist Party of the Netherlands has ever had a mayor (Hanneke Jagersma).

Geography 

To the west is the province Friesland, to the south is the province Drenthe, to the east the German districts are Leer and Emsland in the state Lower Saxony, and to the north the North Sea, Ems, and Dollart.

Groningen is the 7th largest province of the Netherlands.

The land in Groningen is flat. A large area of the province is below sea level.

The Groningen gas field near Slochteren is the 8th largest natural gas field in the world. Since 1986, the exploitation of this gas field has caused earthquakes in the region with magnitudes up to 3.6.

In the Wadden Sea of Groningen, a UNESCO World Heritage Site since 2009, are the sandbank Simonszand and the natural reserve Rottum consisting of the three uninhabited islands Rottumeroog, Rottumerplaat, and Zuiderduintjes. The national park Lauwersmeer (IUCN category II) is located on the border between Groningen and Friesland.

Subdivisions 
The province of Groningen is also called Stad en Ommelanden, which means the city of Groningen and its surrounding lands, which are the historical regions of Fivelingo, Hunsingo, Oldambt, Westerkwartier, and Westerwolde.

The province (Nomenclature of Territorial Units for Statistics or NUTS level 2) is divided into three COROP regions (NUTS level 3): East Groningen, Delfzijl and surroundings, and the rest of Groningen. The COROP regions are used for statistical purposes.

The province is also divided into 10 municipalities, each with its own local government. Currently, Groningen is the most populated and most densely populated municipality, containing the largest city.

Climate 
The province of Groningen has an oceanic climate (Köppen climate classification: Cfb).

Demographics 

The city of Groningen is the most populous city in the province and the 6th most populous city in the Netherlands.

On 1 January 2013, 92.2% of the total provincial population was born in the Netherlands; and of the 7.8% that was born abroad, the ten most common foreign countries of origin are the neighbour Germany (1.09%), the former colonies and dependencies Indonesia (0.60%), Netherlands Antilles and Aruba (0.55%), Suriname (0.54%), and other countries Turkey (0.41%), Soviet Union (0.36%), China (0.32%), Poland (0,26%), Yugoslavia (0.26%), and United Kingdom (0.18%).

Religion
In 2015, 18.7% of the population belonged to the Protestant Church in the Netherlands while 4.9% was Roman Catholic, 1.3% was Muslim and 6.7% belonged to other churches or faiths. Over half (68.4%) of the population identified as non-religious.

Economy 

The city of Groningen is the economic center of the province. In the 14th century, the city became a member of the Hanseatic League. Currently some of the city's major employers are University Medical Center Groningen with 12,141 employees, University of Groningen with 5,591 employees, Municipality of Groningen with 3,063 employees, Education Implementation Service (DUO) with 2,000 employees, and Gasunie with 1,748 employees.

The other economically important area is the Ems delta with the sea ports of Delfzijl and Eemshaven. In 2015, a total of 11,589 cargo vessels arrived at the two Groningen Seaports combined, 7,111 sea vessels and 4,478 inland vessels. The ports had a cargo throughput of 11,309,000 tonnes. The chemical industry near Delfzijl is located at the Chemie Park in Farmsum, with factories of AkzoNobel, Lubrizol, and Teijin Aramid. Both GDF Suez and Vattenfall have a natural gas-fired power plant in Eemshaven, and Essent is building a coal-fired power plant there.

The Gross domestic product (GDP) of the province was 25 billion € in 2018, accounting for 3.2% of the Netherlands economic output. GDP per capita adjusted for purchasing power was 37,300 € or 124% of the EU27 average in the same year.

In 1959, the Groningen gas field near Slochteren was discovered, and the NAM started to exploit the field in 1963. This caused Dutch disease and induced earthquakes.

In 2013, Groningen had a labor force of 268,000 people and unemployment rate of 9.6%, which is the second highest unemployment for a province in the Netherlands.

Culture

Language 

Groningen is home to the Low Saxon dialect called Gronings (Grönnegs / Grunnegs in Gronings regional language), In the eastern part of Friesland variations of the Groninger 'language' is spoken. Gronings has local nuances, for example, the people in the eastern part speak Gronings with more German influence. Nowadays, many inhabitants of the province don't speak the dialect, especially in the city of Groningen where many outsiders have moved.

Cuisine 

Traditional dishes and delicacies from Groningen are boerenkoolstamppot, droge worst, krentjebrij, oudewijvenkoek, poffert, and spekdik. Traditional alcoholic drinks are boerenjongens, boerenmeisjes, fladderak, and heet bier.

Museums 

Museumhuis Groningen is an umbrella organization for museums and other heritage organizations in the province of Groningen and has 58 members. The Groninger Museum is the most visited museum in the province with 209,195 visitors in 2015. The other museums and heritage organizations with more than 25 thousand visitors in 2015 are Fort Bourtange in Bourtange, Noordelijk Scheepvaartmuseum in Groningen, Ter Apel Monastery in Ter Apel, Fraeylemaborg in Slochteren, Nationaal Bus Museum in Hoogezand, and Museumspoorlijn STAR in Stadskanaal.

Heritage sites

Sports 

FC Groningen from the city of Groningen is the only football club from the province in the Eredivisie. Their home stadium Euroborg has a capacity of 22,550 seats. In the 2012–2013 competition, FC Groningen became 7th of the 18 teams. SC Veendam played in the Eerste Divisie, but filed for bankruptcy in 2013.

The city of Groningen is also the base of basketball club GasTerra Flames, volleyball club Lycurgus, and korfball club Nic.

The ice rink at the multi-sport center Kardinge in the city of Groningen is used for national speed skating championships, most recently the 2013 KNSB Dutch Sprint Championships.

Politics 

A provincial government in the Netherlands consists of a Provincial Council, the directly elected legislative branch, and a Provincial Executive, the executive branch. The King's Commissioner, who is appointed by the national government, is chairman of both branches. The Provincial Council of Groningen consists of 43 members and the Provincial Executive consists of the King's Commissioner and six deputies. The government has its seat in the city of Groningen, which is the provincial capital.

René Paas, member of the Christian Democratic Appeal (CDA), has been the King's Commissioner since 18 April 2016. He succeeded Max van den Berg who was the King's Commissioner in Groningen from 2007 to 2016.

In the provincial elections of 2011, the Labour Party became the largest party with nearly 25% of the votes and 12 seats in the Provincial Council. The next three largest parties are the People's Party for Freedom and Democracy (VVD) and the Socialist Party (SP) with 6 seats each, and the Christian Democratic Appeal (CDA) with 5 seats. In 2011, two months after the elections, the member of the Party for the North (PvhN) continued as an independent under the name Free Mandate. The next provincial elections are planned for 18 March 2015.

Following the 2011 elections, the Provincial Executive was formed by a coalition of the Labour Party, the People's Party for Freedom and Democracy, Democrats 66 (D66), and GreenLeft (GL). In 2013, GreenLeft left the coalition and was replaced by the ChristianUnion (CU). The Labour Party has three deputies, the other coalition parties have one deputy each.

|-
!colspan="2" align="left"| Party
! Votes
! %
! Seats
|-
|bgcolor=""|
|align="left"| Socialist Party
| 39,093
| 16.19
| 8
|-
|bgcolor=""|
|align="left"| Labour Party
| 29,711
| 12.30
| 6
|-
|bgcolor=""|
|align="left"| Christian Democratic Appeal
| 27,160
| 11.25
| 5
|-
|bgcolor=""|
|align="left"| Democrats 66
| 23,422
| 9.70
| 4
|-
|bgcolor=""|
|align="left"| People's Party for Freedom and Democracy
| 22,089
| 9.15
| 4
|-
|bgcolor=""|
|align="left"| Christian Union
| 21,124
| 8.75
| 4
|-
|bgcolor=""|
|align="left"| Party for Freedom
| 19,340
| 8.01
| 3
|-
|
|align="left"| Groninger Belang
| 15,869
| 6.57
| 3
|-
|bgcolor=""|
|align="left"| GroenLinks
| 15,701
| 6.50
| 3
|-
|bgcolor=""|
|align="left"| Party for the Animals
| 9,078
| 3.76
| 2
|-
|
|align="left"| Party for the North
| 5,173
| 2.14
| 1
|-
|colspan="7" style="background: #C0C0C0"|
|-
|
|align="left"| Other parties
| 13,719
| 5.68
| 0
|-
!colspan="2"| Total
! 241,479
! 100
! 43
|}

Transportation

Roads 

In the province of Groningen, there are three national roads, which are maintained by Rijkswaterstaat. The motorway A7 (E22) connects the city of Groningen with the provinces of Friesland and North Holland in the west and with Winschoten and Germany in the east. The motorway is interrupted for the ring road of the city of Groningen, where it is the expressway N7. The motorway A28 (E232) starts at the city of Groningen and runs south connecting it with the provinces of Drenthe, Overijssel, Gelderland, and Utrecht. The expressway N33 runs south from Eemshaven, via Appingedam and Veendam, to Drenthe. Other roads are overseen by the province (N roads), municipalities, or water boards.

Public transport 

Public transport falls under the rules for government procurement in the European Union. Tenders for regional bus and railway services are selected by the province of Groningen. Qbuzz is contracted for bus services in the period 2009–2015 and Arriva for railway services in the period 2005–2020. Nederlandse Spoorwegen operates the railway services from Groningen railway station southward to Drenthe and beyond.

The railway network in the Netherlands is maintained by ProRail. There are six railways located partially or entirely in the province of Groningen. The railway station Groningen connects several of these railways.

Airports 

The international airport that serves Groningen is Groningen Airport Eelde, which is located in Eelde in the province of Drenthe. The airport is co-owned by the provinces of Groningen and Drenthe and the municipalities of Groningen, Assen, and Tynaarlo. Its summer destinations are Antalya, Faro, Girona, Gran Canaria, Heraklion, Kos, Palma de Mallorca, and Tenerife. Its winter destinations are Innsbruck and Salzburg. Starting on 5 June 2014, there will also be flights to London. For other international destinations, Amsterdam Airport Schiphol is the nearest airport. The general aviation airports in the province are Oostwold Airport in Oostwold and Stadskanaal Airfield in Stadskanaal.

Science and education 

The University of Groningen in the city of Groningen was founded in 1614 and is the only research university (universiteit) in the province. On 1 September 2013, it had 29,407 students and 5,238 full-time equivalent of staff members. The university has ten faculties: Arts, Behavioural and Social Sciences, Economics and Business, Law, Mathematics and Natural Sciences, Medical Sciences, Philosophy, Spatial Sciences, Theology and Religious Studies, and University College Groningen.

The Hanze University of Applied Sciences, the NHL University of Applied Sciences, and the Stenden University of Applied Sciences in the city of Groningen are the province's publicly funded universities of applied sciences (hogescholen).

Media 
The Dagblad van het Noorden is a regional daily newspaper based in the city of Groningen and is owned by NDC Mediagroep. It was founded in 2002 by merging the Nieuwsblad van het Noorden, the Groninger Dagblad, and the Drentse Courant. In 2015, the newspaper had a circulation of 96,515.

RTV Noord is a regional public broadcaster of radio and television based in the city of Groningen, with Radio Noord and TV Noord. Their radio station has 121,000 daily listeners and a market share of 28% (2012) and their TV station has 171,000 daily viewers and a market share of 26.7% (2012).

Notable residents 
People from the province of Groningen:

See also
 Gronings dialect 
 Hoogholtje bridge

References

External links

, official government website
Nothing Tops Groningen, official tourism website

 
Provinces of the Netherlands
West Frisia
Lordships of the Holy Roman Empire